"Booty Bounce" is a song by German electro-house music producer Tujamo, which was later remixed with additional vocals from British singer Taio Cruz. The song was released as a digital download in Germany on 1 February 2016 by Spinnin' Records. The song has charted in Germany and the Netherlands.

Track listing

Chart performance

Weekly charts

Release history

References

2016 singles
2016 songs
Tujamo songs
Taio Cruz songs